The Man from Bitter Ridge is a 1955 American Western film directed by Jack Arnold and starring Lex Barker, Mara Corday and Stephen McNally.

Plot
A stranger comes to the town of Tomahawk to investigate who is behind a series of stagecoach holdups.

Cast
 Lex Barker as Jeff Carr
 Mara Corday as Holly Kenton
 Stephen McNally as Alec Black
 John Dehner as Rance Jackman
 Trevor Bardette as Sheriff Dunham
 Ray Teal as Shep Bascom 
 Warren Stevens as Linc Jackman
 Myron Healey as Clem Jackman
 John Harmon as Norman Roberts
 John Cliff as Wolf Landers
 Richard Garland as Jace Gordon

See also
List of American films of 1955

External links
 
 
 

1955 films
Films directed by Jack Arnold
1955 Western (genre) films
American Western (genre) films
Universal Pictures films
1950s English-language films
1950s American films